The 2018 Players Championship was a professional golf tournament, held from May 10–13 at TPC Sawgrass in Ponte Vedra Beach, Florida. The flagship event of the PGA Tour, this was the 45th edition of The Players Championship, and the 37th edition held at the Stadium Course at TPC Sawgrass. The tournament was won by Webb Simpson, four strokes ahead of three runners-up.

Defending champion Kim Si-woo opened with a five-under 67, but finished 15 strokes back, tied for 63rd place.

This was the twelfth consecutive Players Championship held in May; it returned to March in 2019.

Venue

Course layout

Field
The field consisted of 144 players meeting the following criteria. Each player is listed according to the first category by which he qualified with additional categories in which he qualified shown in parentheses.
1. Winners of PGA Tour events since last Players
Ryan Armour, Daniel Berger (2,9), Patrick Cantlay (2,9), Austin Cook, Jason Day (2,4,5,7,8,9), Bryson DeChambeau (2,9), Jason Dufner (2,4,8), Brice Garnett, Billy Horschel (2), Dustin Johnson (2,4,7,9,13), Kim Si-woo (2,5,9), Kevin Kisner (2,9), Patton Kizzire (2,13), Satoshi Kodaira (9), Brooks Koepka (2,4,9), Andrew Landry (13), Marc Leishman (2,8,9), Hideki Matsuyama (2,7,9), Rory McIlroy (2,4,6,8,9), Phil Mickelson (2,4,7,9,13), Grayson Murray (2), Pat Perez (2,9), Scott Piercy (2), Ted Potter Jr., Ian Poulter (2,9), Jon Rahm (2,9,13), Patrick Reed (2,4,9,13), Justin Rose (2,4,9,13), Xander Schauffele (2,6,9), Jordan Spieth (2,4,6,9), Kyle Stanley (2,9), Brendan Steele (2,9), Henrik Stenson (2,4,9), Chris Stroud (2), Justin Thomas (2,4,9,13), Jhonattan Vegas (2), Bubba Watson (2,4,9,13), Gary Woodland (2,9)
 Paul Casey (2,9) did not play due to injury.

2. Top 125 from previous season's FedEx Cup points list
An Byeong-hun, Blayne Barber, Ryan Blaum, Jonas Blixt, Dominic Bozzelli, Keegan Bradley, Scott Brown, Wesley Bryan, Rafa Cabrera-Bello (9), Chad Campbell, Bud Cauley, Kevin Chappell (9), Stewart Cink, Harris English, Derek Fathauer, Tony Finau (9,13), Martin Flores, Rickie Fowler (5,9), Sergio García (4,9), Robert Garrigus, Brian Gay, Lucas Glover, Branden Grace (9), Cody Gribble, Emiliano Grillo, Bill Haas, Adam Hadwin (9), James Hahn, Brian Harman (9), Russell Henley (9), J. J. Henry, Charley Hoffman (9), J. B. Holmes, Charles Howell III, Mackenzie Hughes, John Huh, Zach Johnson (4), Kang Sung-hoon, Michael Kim, Kim Meen-whee, Chris Kirk, Russell Knox (7), Jason Kokrak, Kelly Kraft, Matt Kuchar (9), Anirban Lahiri, Martin Laird, Danny Lee, David Lingmerth (8), Luke List, Jamie Lovemark, Ben Martin, William McGirt (8), Francesco Molinari (9), Ryan Moore, Kevin Na, Geoff Ogilvy, Sean O'Hair, Louis Oosthuizen (9), Rod Pampling, Pan Cheng-tsung, D. A. Points, Chez Reavie, Patrick Rodgers, Rory Sabbatini, Ollie Schniederjans, Charl Schwartzel, Adam Scott (7), Webb Simpson (9), Cameron Smith (9), Brandt Snedeker, J. J. Spaun, Scott Stallings, Robert Streb, Kevin Streelman, Steve Stricker, Hudson Swafford, Nick Taylor, Vaughn Taylor, Kevin Tway, Tyrone van Aswegen, Harold Varner III, Jimmy Walker (4), Nick Watney, Richy Werenski

Graham DeLaet, Luke Donald, Brandon Hagy, Jim Herman, Morgan Hoffmann, and Camilo Villegas did not play.
Noh Seung-yul was unable to compete due to a military obligation in South Korea.

3. Top 125 (medical)
Ryan Palmer, Michael Thompson

4. Major champions from the past five years
Martin Kaymer (5), Danny Willett

5. Players Championship winners from the past five years
Tiger Woods

6. The Tour Championship winners from the past three years

7. World Golf Championship winners from the past three years
Shane Lowry

8. Memorial Tournament and Arnold Palmer Invitational winners from the past three years

9. Top 50 from the Official World Golf Ranking
Kiradech Aphibarnrat, Ross Fisher, Matt Fitzpatrick, Tommy Fleetwood, Tyrrell Hatton, Alexander Lévy, Li Haotong, Alex Norén

10. Senior Players champion from prior year
Scott McCarron

11. Web.com Tour money leader from prior season
Chesson Hadley (12)

12. Money leader during the Web.com Tour Finals

13. Top 10 current year FedEx Cup points leaders

14. Remaining positions and alternates filled through current year FedEx Cup standings
Brandon Harkins, Tom Hoge, Beau Hossler, Keith Mitchell, Trey Mullinax

Nationalities in the field

Round summaries

First round
Thursday, May 10, 2018

Kim Si-woo shot 67 (−5), the lowest first round score by a defending champion since the event moved to Florida; six players were a shot better at 66.

Second round
Friday, May 11, 2018

Webb Simpson tied the course record with a round of 63 (−9) to open up a five-shot lead. Simpson had six consecutive birdies on holes  which also tied a tournament record. He was 11-under on his round until his tee shot found the water on the par-3 17th and made double bogey. His score of 129 (−15) after 36 holes tied Jason Day (2016) for the tournament record, while his five-shot lead set a new record.

For the second consecutive year, at least eighty players made the 36-hole cut, which invoked a 54-hole cut.

Third round
Saturday, May 12, 2018

Final round
Sunday, May 13, 2018

Scorecard
Final round

Cumulative tournament scores, relative to par
{|class="wikitable" span = 50 style="font-size:85%;
|-
|style="background: Red;" width=10|
|Eagle
|style="background: Pink;" width=10|
|Birdie
|style="background: PaleGreen;" width=10|
|Bogey
|style="background: Green;" width=10|
|Double bogey
|}

References

External links

2018
2018 in golf
2018 in American sports
2018 in sports in Florida
May 2018 sports events in the United States